Blérancourt is a commune in the department of Aisne in Hauts-de-France in northern France.

Population

Sights

The Château de Blérancourt, an influential design by Salomon de Brosse houses the National Museum of French-American Friendship and Cooperation, (Musée franco-américain), founded by Anne Morgan, daughter of the financier J. Pierpont Morgan (due to reopen in 2007). The collections of the Museum include many works on the theme of WW1, among them several paintings of Joseph-Félix Bouchor.

The corps de logis of the château no longer exists, but de Brosse's twin cubical stone pavilions and a grand entrance gateway approached by a stone bridge across a moat (now dry) survive. The pavilions have identical façades on all sides, framed in rusticated quoins at the corners: each consists of a pair of pedimented windows that make a composition with a central œil de bœuf window under a semicyclical arch that carries the dentilled cornice across and breaks into the roof balustrading above. Slate roofs with cyma curves converge to a central four-sided cap. The central gateway takes the form of a triumphal arch with a prominent keystone. The Jardins du Nouveau Monde, on its grounds, contain an arboretum and garden plants from the New World.

The house of Louis de Saint-Just now houses a museum devoted to the French Revolution.

Notable people from Blérancourt
Claude-Nicolas Le Cat (1700-1768) anatomist and surgeon.
Louis Antoine de Saint-Just (1767-1794) revolutionary and author.

See also
Communes of the Aisne department
Musée Franco-Américain website

References

Communes of Aisne
Aisne communes articles needing translation from French Wikipedia